Korth is a high-end firearms manufacturer based in Lollar, Hesse, Germany. Their high-end revolvers cost over €3,000 and their semi-automatic pistols cost over €4,000.

History
The company was founded in 1954 by Willi Korth, a railway engineer, who began his business in a basement workshop making gas pistols.

Firearms

Revolvers

Korth Combat
Korth Asia
Korth Bellezza

Semi-autos
Korth PRS

See also
 Janz, a German premium revolver manufacturer
 Arminius, another German revolver manufacturer
 Röhm/RG, a defunct German revolver and handgun manufacturer

References

External links
 Korth German
 Korth USA

Manufacturing companies established in 1954
Firearm manufacturers of Germany
Giessen (district)
Companies based in Hesse
1954 establishments in West Germany